"Afternoon in Paris" is a 1949 jazz standard. It was written by John Lewis.

"Afternoon in Paris" has a 32-bar AABA form and is usually played in the key of C major. In several of the song's phrases, the tonal center changes (when played in C, there is a shift to B and A), defining a complex harmonic structure that is of interest to both theoreticians and soloists.

Notable recordings
Phineas Newborn Quartet, Here Is Phineas (Atlantic, May 1956)
John Lewis and Sacha Distel, Afternoon in Paris (Atlantic, 1957)
Benny Golson Quintet, Benny Golson and the Philadelphians (United Artists, 1958)
Sonny Rollins and Co., Now's the Time (RCA Victor, 1964)
John Lewis, solo piano, Evolution (Atlantic, January 1999)

See also
List of jazz standards

References

1940s jazz standards
1949 songs
Compositions by John Lewis (pianist)
Jazz compositions in C major